The Old Cathedral (Spanish: Catedral Vieja de Santa María) is one of two cathedrals in Salamanca, Spain, the other being the New Cathedral of Salamanca. The two cathedrals are joined together.

History
It was founded by Bishop Jerome of Périgord, in the 12th century and completed in Romanesque/Gothic style in the 14th century. It is dedicated to Santa Maria de la Sede (Saint Mary of the See).

The apse houses a large cycle of 53 tableaux, 12 of which by the 15th-century Italian artist Dello Delli, depicting the life of Jesus and the Virgin Mary. A fresco of the Final Judgement is over them.

Juan Francés de Iribarren was organist at the Old Cathedral in 1717–1733. Its crossing tower inspired American architect H.H. Richardson's celebrated 1872 design for the central tower of Trinity Church (Boston).

Interior gallery

See also
 New Cathedral, Salamanca
 History of medieval Arabic and Western European domes

References

Further reading

 BRASAS EGIDO, José Carlos: "Catedral de Salamanca", in Las Catedrales de Castilla y León, León: Edilesa, 1992.
 CASASECA CASASECA, Antonio: Las Catedrales de Salamanca. Salamanca: Edilesa, 2008.
 GÓMEZ GONZÁLEZ, P. J.; VICENTE BAZ, R. Guía del Archivo y Biblioteca de la Catedral de Salamanca. Salamanca: Catedral, 2007.
 IERONIMUS 900 años de arte y de historia [exhibition catalogue]. Salamanca: Catedral de Salamanca, 2002:0

Roman Catholic churches in Salamanca
Salamanca
Romanesque architecture in Castile and León
14th-century Roman Catholic church buildings in Spain
Gothic architecture in Castile and León